Emily Chenette is an American biochemist and journal editor. She is the editor-in-chief of PLOS One.

Career
She received her Bachelor of Arts degree in Biochemistry from Columbia University in 2000. Chenette received her doctorate in genetics and molecular biology from the University of North Carolina at Chapel Hill and did her postdoctoral research at Duke University.

After completing her postdoctoral research, she served as the associate editor at Signaling Gateway. In 2010, she became the Senior Editor at Nature Cell Biology. Then in 2015, she became the editorial manager for The FEBS Journal. In 2018, she became the editor-in-chief of PLOS One.

References

Living people
American women biochemists
Duke University alumni
University of North Carolina at Chapel Hill alumni
Year of birth missing (living people)
Academic journal editors
21st-century American women
Columbia University alumni